André Colin (19 January 1910 – 29 August 1978) was a French politician. He served as a member of the National Assembly from 1945 to 1958, and as a member of the French Senate from 1959 to 1978, representing Finistère.

References

1910 births
1978 deaths
French Ministers of Overseas France
Presidents of the Regional Council of Brittany
Members of the Regional Council of Brittany
Politicians from Brest, France
Popular Republican Movement politicians
Members of the Constituent Assembly of France (1945)
Members of the Constituent Assembly of France (1946)
Deputies of the 1st National Assembly of the French Fourth Republic
Deputies of the 2nd National Assembly of the French Fourth Republic
Deputies of the 3rd National Assembly of the French Fourth Republic
French Senators of the Fifth Republic
Senators of Finistère